Sandberg is a Swedish surname, meaning "Sand Mountain". Zandberg is a variant spelling.

Geographical distribution
As of 2014, 46.4% of all known bearers of the surname Sandberg were residents of Sweden (frequency 1:540), 30.7% of the United States (1:29,945), 6.6% of Norway (1:1,976), 4.6% of Finland (1:3,032), 4.3% of Denmark (1:3,354), 2.2% of Canada (1:41,674) and 1.2% of Germany (1:167,842).

In Sweden, the frequency of the surname was higher than national average (1:540) in the following counties:
 1. Norrbotten County (1:211)
 2. Västerbotten County (1:353)
 3. Jönköping County (1:399)
 4. Örebro County (1:433)
 5. Västmanland County (1:449)
 6. Södermanland County (1:468)
 7. Östergötland County (1:482)
 8. Halland County (1:540)

In Norway, the frequency of the surname was higher than national average (1:1,976) in the following regions:
 1. Eastern Norway (1:1,403)
 2. Northern Norway (1:1,747)
 3. Trøndelag (1:1,940)

In Finland, the frequency of the surname was higher than national average (1:3,032) in the following regions:
 1. Åland (1:505)
 2. Ostrobothnia (1:649)
 3. Satakunta (1:1,351)
 4. Uusimaa (1:2,177)
 5. Tavastia Proper (1:2,571)
 6. Southwest Finland (1:2,624)

People
Anders Sandberg, Swedish researcher, science debater, futurist, and author.
Ann Linnea Sandberg (1938–2009), American immunologist
Artie Sandberg, American professional football player in the National Football League
A. W. Sandberg (1887–1938), Danish film director and screenwriter
Christina Sandberg, Swedish tennis player
Eliezer Sandberg, former Israeli politician
Emily Sandberg, American model and actress
Erling Sandberg (1879–1956), Norwegian appointed councillor of state
Eric Sandberg (1884–1966), Swedish sailor who competed in the 1908 Summer Olympics
Eva Sandberg, Jewish German photographer who took Soviet citizenship
Gösta Sandberg (1932–2006), Swedish footballer, icehockey and bandy player
Gunnar Sandberg, Swedish Social Democratic politician
Gustav Sandberg (1888–1958), Swedish football (soccer) player
Harald Sandberg Swedish diplomat and civil servant
Henrik Sandberg Danish film producer
Inger and Lasse Sandberg, Swedish authors of children's books
Jacqueline Royaards-Sandberg (1876–1976), Dutch stage actress
Jared Sandberg, American Major League Baseball third baseman
Kristin Sandberg, Norwegian football player and World Champion.
Louise Sandberg, Danish born fashion designer based in London UK
Martin Sandberg, Swedish music producer
Michael Sandberg, Executive Chairman of The Hong Kong and Shanghai Banking
Mikael Sandberg, Swedish ice hockey goaltender
Mordecai Sandberg Canadian composer and physician
Niklas Sandberg, Swedish footballer
Niklas Sandberg, Norwegian footballer
Ole Marius Sandberg, Norwegian jazz musician
Olga Sandberg, Swedish ballerina
Oskar Sandberg, Swedish contributor to the Freenet Project
Per Sandberg, Norwegian politician and a member of the Progress Party (FRP)
Robert Sandberg, American playwright and a lecturer at Princeton University
Roland Sandberg, Swedish footballer
Ryne Sandberg, American former second baseman in Major League Baseball
R.N. Sandberg, American playwright and lecturer at Princeton University
Sandy Sandberg (1910–1989), American football player
Sheryl Sandberg, Chief Operating Officer of Facebook
Tom Sandberg, Norwegian Nordic combined skier
Thomas Sandberg, Danish composer
Willem Sandberg, (1897–1984) Dutch typographer and museum curator

References

Swedish-language surnames